Harry Joseph Flynn (May 2, 1933 – September 22, 2019) was an American prelate of the Catholic Church who served as archbishop of the Archdiocese of Saint Paul and Minneapolis from 1995 to 2008.  He previously served as bishop of the Diocese of Lafayette from 1989 to 1994.

Biography

Early life 

Harry Flynn was born in Schenectady, New York, on May 3, 1933 to William and Margaret Mahoney Flynn. Orphaned when he was age 12, he was primarily raised primarily by two aunts. Flynn attended from Siena College in Loudenville, New York, earning bachelor and master degrees in English. He then attended Mount Saint Mary's Seminary in Emmitsburg, Maryland,

Priesthood 
Flynn was ordained to the priesthood by Bishop William Scully on May 18, 1960 for the Diocese of Albany.  After his ordination, Flynn taught English at Catholic Central High School in Troy, New York and held pastoral positions in several parishes. In 1965, Flynn went to Maryland to become a faculty member and dean at Mount Saint Mary's Seminary. Flynn was promoted to vice-rector in 1968 and rector in 1970.  After returned to Albany in 1979, he was appointed director of clergy continuing education and as pastor of St. Ambrose Parish in Latham, New York.

One day in 1986, Flynn's secretary in Albany, New York, received a phone call from the papal nuncio for the United States. When she told Flynn to call him back, he realized that the pope was going to appoint him as a bishop.  In an attempt to dodge the conversation with the nuncio, Flynn drove to a family cabin on Shroon Lake in New York.  Cardinal John O’Connor sent a New York state trooper to bring Flynn back to Albany to call the papal nuncio. Flynn later remarked "If I had 100 lives, I’d live every one of them as a priest - and none as a bishop!"

Bishop of Lafayette in Louisiana 

Pope John Paul II appointed Flynn as coadjutor bishop for the Diocese of Lafayette in Louisiana on April 19, 1986.  Flynn was consecrated by Bishop Howard Hubbard on June 24, 1986. Flynn succeed Bishop Gerard Frey when he resigned on May 12, 1989.

Archbishop of Saint Paul and Minneapolis 
On February 22, 1994, Flynn was appointed by John Paul II as the coadjutor archbishop of the Archdiocese of Saint Paul and Minneapolis.  He became archbishop on September 8, 1995, with the resignation of Archbishop John Robert Roach.

In 1996, Flynn testified in a sexual abuse lawsuit brought against the archdiocese by Dale Scheffler.  The plaintiff claimed that he had been sexually abused by Robert Kapoun, an archdiocese priest, in the 1970's and 1980's, and that the archdiocese had covered up his alleged crimes.  On trial, Kapoun admitted to abusing three boys and records showed that the archdiocese had made secret settlements to other victims of Kapoun.  When questioned in court, Flynn could not recall any detail on the case.  Scheffler won the case, but it was overturned on appeal.  Flynn only removed Kapoun from ministry when the court case started.  The archdiocese sent Scheffler a bill for its legal costs.

In 2002, Flynn led the committee at the US Conference of Catholic Bishops that wrote the "Charter for the Protection of Children and Young People" and the "Essential Norms for Diocesan/Eparchial Policies Dealing with Allegations of Sexual Abuse of Minors by Priests or Deacons".  These two documents would set policy in the United States for dealing with sexual abuse allegations against priests, deacons and other clergy, with the notable exception of bishops.

In May 2005, Flynn publicly criticized Minnesota governor Tim Pawlenty in the Star Tribune for what he perceived as irresponsible tax policies. Flynn was an outspoken opponent of the war in Iraq. 

After serving as archbishop for 12 years, Flynn requested that the pope assign him a coadjutor archbishop.  On April 24, 2007, Pope Benedict XVI appointed Bishop John Nienstedt as Flynn's coadjutor.

In January 2008, Flynn, citing a Vatican instruction from 2004, ordered an end to the practice of lay preaching at Mass. He said:"There has to be that kind of training and theological background that even a person with a master's degree in theology would not have. The church does not want people just standing up there and giving opinions or even things they've read in books."

Retirement 

On May 5, 2008, Pope Benedict XVI accepted Flynn's resignation and Nienstedt succeeded him as archbishop. Flynn continued to assist in the archdiocese after his retirement, administering confirmations, leading retreats, and other liturgies.

In November 2010,  the Little Sisters of the Poor honored Flynn with their St. Jeanne Jugan Award on the 50th anniversary of his ordination. He resigned from the board of the University of St. Thomas in St. Paul on October 14, 2013. Harry Flynn died on September 22, 2019, from bone cancer in Saint Paul, Minnesota at the age of 86.

Appointments
Board member at The Catholic University of America
Chair of the board at Saint Paul Seminary School of Divinity
Chair of the board at the University of St. Thomas
Board president of Saint John Vianney Seminary
Board member of the College of Saint Catherine
Member of the United States Conference of Catholic Bishops (USCCB) Committee for Black Catholics
Chair of the USCCB Committee on Sexual Abuse
Member of the USCCB Committee on the Charismatic Renewal Movement.

Viewpoints

Abortion 
In a 1996 pastoral letter titled "Abortion and a Failure of Community", Flynn talked about the need to provide support to pregnant women who choose not terminate their pregnancy with an abortion.  He said:I want our local church to say loudly and clearly: “No woman should feel so alone that abortion seems her only alternative. No man need feel so trapped or fearful that he believes there is no other answer.” I want us to be able to say to any woman: “Come to any Catholic parish in this archdiocese and you will find help.”

Racism 
On September 12, 2003, Flynn released a pastoral letter titled In God's Image, in which he called for the parishes in the archdiocese to work on ending racism and promote diversity and harmony, and in so doing, to make God's love more present to the rest of the world  He said:Racism is a serious moral evil. It is a sin. This has been the clear message from the moral teaching of the Church. Both the Scriptures and contemporary Church teaching help us to understand why racism is such a serious violation of God’s will.

LBGT rights 
In 2005, Flynn sent a letter to the Rainbow Sash Alliance telling them that anyone wearing a rainbow sash to church in the archdiocese would be denied communion.  He said:"The criterion for reception of the Eucharist is the same for all — recipients must be in a state of Grace and free from Mortal sin. While the decision for that judgment rests with an individual Catholic's conscience, it has never been nor is it now acceptable for a communicant to use the reception of Communion as an act of protest.''

Legacy 
In 2009, the University of St. Thomas renamed Selby Hall to Flynn Hall to recognize Flynn.

See also
 

 Catholic Church hierarchy
 Catholic Church in the United States
 Historical list of the Catholic bishops of the United States
 List of Catholic bishops of the United States
 Lists of patriarchs, archbishops, and bishops

References

External links
Roman Catholic Archdiocese of Saint Paul and Minneapolis Official Site
Brief biography from the Archdiocese of Saint Paul and Minneapolis

1933 births
2019 deaths
20th-century Roman Catholic archbishops in the United States
21st-century Roman Catholic archbishops in the United States
Roman Catholic archbishops of Saint Paul and Minneapolis
People from Schenectady, New York
Mount St. Mary's University alumni
University of St. Thomas (Minnesota) people
Catholic University of America trustees
Siena College alumni
Catholics from New York (state)
Deaths from bone cancer
Deaths from cancer in Minnesota